The Last Rockstars is a Japanese rock supergroup formed in 2022 by Yoshiki (X Japan), Hyde (L'Arc-en-Ciel, Vamps), Sugizo (X Japan, Luna Sea), and Miyavi. The four members announced their collaboration in November 2022, and released their first self-titled single in December of the same year. In January 2023, the band performed their debut tour in Japan and the United States.

History 
The formation of The Last Rockstars was announced at a press conference in Tokyo on November 11, 2022. The four members–Yoshiki, Hyde, Sugizo, and Miyavi–also announced a pair of upcoming single and several concerts scheduled for January and February 2023 in Tokyo, New York, and Los Angeles. Yoshiki stated that the mission of the group was to "aim at the international market beyond Japan" and to "preserve the spirit of rock music," which the musician claimed has been overtaken in the modern music scene by pop and hip-hop. The provocative name was chosen "to leave an impression".

On December 14, the band announced a second New York City show had been added to the tour schedule due to high demand, followed by the announcement that the band would release their music through Melodee Music/Ingrooves, a sub-label of Universal Music and Virgin Music Group.

On December 23, the Last Rockstars released their debut single, "The Last Rockstars (Paris Mix)". On December 31, the members made their debut performance as a band on NHK's New Year's Eve music program 73rd NHK Kōhaku Uta Gassen, setting a record by performing on the nationwide program just eight days after the release of their first single. In January 2023, the group launched their first international tour with sold-out shows in Tokyo, New York, and Los Angeles.

Members 
 Yoshiki – leader, drums, piano
 Hyde – vocals
 Sugizo – guitar, violin
 Miyavi – guitar

Discography

Singles

References

External links 

Japanese rock music groups
Musical groups from Tokyo
2022 establishments in Japan
Musical groups established in 2022
Rock music supergroups
Visual kei musical groups